Hypertrichosis 1 (universalis, congenital) is a protein that in humans is encoded by the HTC1 gene.

References 

Genes